Rajesh Gahlot (born 22 September 1964) is an Indian Politician and a leader of the Bharatiya Janata Party. He was elected to Delhi Legislative Assembly from Matiala constituency in Fifth Delhi Assembly.

Electoral Performance

References

1964 births
Delhi MLAs 2013–2015
Living people
People from Nawada district
Bharatiya Janata Party politicians from Delhi